Ghora is a village located near Tarutta in Pakistan Azad Jummah Kashmir. It is one of the oldest villages in Dadyal.

Large numbers of Ghora's residents are from the UK, and have in recent years invested and spent much money into the region. As a result the area has developed amenities such as large villas and shopping centres.

References

Populated places in Mirpur District